Elizabeth Spehar is the Head of the United Nations Peacekeeping Force in Cyprus (UNFICYP).

Biography

Elizabeth Spehar was born in Port Arthur, Ontario (now Thunder Bay, Ontario), Canada, and has one daughter. She is a graduate of Queen's University in Canada with a Bachelor of Arts. She also holds a master's degree in international affairs from Carleton University and a diploma from the University of Pau in France. 

For more than 12 years, she worked with the Organization of American States where she was a senior official.  

Spehar joined the United Nations Department of Political Affairs in 2007. During this time she has held several key positions including Director of the Europe Division and Director for the Americas and Europe Division. In 2008, she also held the position as Interim Special Representative of the Secretary-General and Head of UNFICYP.   

Prior to this appointment of 30 March 2016, she was the Director of the Policy and Mediation Division with the United Nations Department of Political Affairs.
 Ms. Spehar has held positions in the past that included serving as the Director of the Policy and Mediation Division, as well as Director of the Americas and Europe Division and Director of the Europe Division. While holding those positions she focused substantially on political conflicts which were facing the region at that time. 

As Head of the Nations Peacekeeping Force in Cyprus (UNFICYP), she is the successor to Lisa M. Buttenheim, who completed her term in June of 2016. 
Aside from Spehar’s position of Head of the Nations Peacekeeping Force in Cyprus (UNFICYP), she also acts as the Deputy to the Secretary-General’s Special Adviser.

References

Canadian officials of the United Nations
Living people
Year of birth missing (living people)

External links
 https://unficyp.unmissions.org/new-srsg-elizabeth-spehar-arrives-cyprus. 13 June 2016

 https://www.un.org/sg/en/content/profiles/elizabeth-spehar. (n.d.)